Jon Samuel Lewis is an American fiction writer under the pen name J. S. Lewis. He is co-author of the popular Grey Griffins series, originally published by Scholastic, Inc. The next three books in the Grey Griffins series will be published as the Grey Griffins Clockwork Chronicles by Little, Brown Books for Young Readers.  The original trilogy has sold over 850,000 copies to date.

Background 

Lewis grew up in the Midwestern United States, spending most of his time in Minnesota and Iowa before moving to Arizona where attended Arizona State University, earning a degree in Broadcast Journalism.

At an early age, Lewis set out to become a comic book illustrator, but he discovered a love for writing when he first began crafting the background stories for the comic book characters he had drawn.

Lewis began his first novel at the age of fourteen with writing partner Derek Benz. Intended to be an epic fantasy in the tradition of Tolkien, Lewis and Benz never finished the manuscript.

The authors reunited in Arizona in 2000, however, where they began writing their Grey Griffins series.

Published books 

Grey Griffins series by Derek Benz and Lewis
 The Revenge of the Shadow King (Orchard Books, March 2006)
 The Rise of the Black Wolf (January 2007)
 The Fall of the Templar (January 2008)
 Clockwork Chronicles: The Brimstone Key (Little, Brown, June 2010)
 Clockwork Chronicles: The Relic Hunters (May 2011)
 Clockwork Chronicles: The Paragon Prison (May 2012)
 C.H.A.O.S.
 Invasion (Thomas Nelson, January 2011)
 Alienation (January 2012)
 Domination (April 2013)

References

External links
 
 Author profile at BookReviewsAndMore.ca – with 2011 interview
 

1972 births
American children's writers
American fantasy writers
American male novelists
21st-century American novelists
Living people
Place of birth missing (living people)
21st-century American male writers